Motswako is a Southern African subgenre of hip hop popular in South Africa. It consists of a mix of rap lyrics in both the local language (Setswana) and English layered on a steady beat. Other languages used include Sesotho, Zulu and Afrikaans as per the rapper's origin. The genre gained popularity in the late nineties as South African acts like HHP and Baphixile (consisting of "Prof" and "Blax Myth") started rapping in Setswana, resulting in an increased following from the local population. Because of its reputation in South Africa most of the upcoming artists use this genre as a base before they start their music careers because of its basic principles, a good motswako artist have to learn the creative writing skills used to perfect the genre making it easy to learn and write music. Today there is a high pool of motswako artists in Botswana and South Africa with few females artists.

Notable artists

 Boity
 Cassper Nyovest
 HHP
 Tuks Senganga
 Khuli Chana
 Fifi Cooper
 Mo'Molemi
 Zeus

References

Hip hop genres
South African hip hop
Botswana hip hop